Level 23 was an Australian lifestyle program that aired briefly on Network Ten in 1994. The show featured stories and interviews about a range of youth lifestyle issues.

Presenters
 Brent Meyer
 Anja Coleby
 Nathan Harvey
 Nic Testoni
 Melissa Thomas

See also
 List of Australian television series

References

External links
 

Network 10 original programming
Australian non-fiction television series
1994 Australian television series debuts
English-language television shows